K.M. Shehabuddin was the first Bangladeshi diplomat, and is known for defecting from the Pakistani Foreign Service before the formation of the Mujibnagar government.

Early life
Shehabuddin was born on 11 April 1937 in Chandnaish, Chittagong, East Bengal, British Raj.

Career
Shehabuddin joined the Pakistan Civil Service in 1966.  He was posted in the Pakistan High Commission in New Delhi in 1971 as the second secretary. At the start of the Bangladesh Liberation war, he resigned from the Pakistan Foreign Service on 6 April 1971 and pledged allegiance to Bangladesh, along with his colleague Amjadul Huq. After the independence of Bangladesh, he served as the country's ambassador to the United States, France, Spain, Poland, Colombia, Mexico, Guatemala, and Kuwait. He retired from the diplomatic service in 2001.

Memoir

In 2006, UPL published Shehabuddin's autobiography, There and Back Again: A Diplomat's Tale.

Death
Shehabuddin died on 15 April 2015. In 2016, he was awarded the Independence Award (Shadhinota Padak), the highest civilian honor of Bangladesh, posthumously.

References

1937 births
2015 deaths
People from Chittagong District
Awami League politicians
Recipients of the Independence Day Award
Ambassadors of Bangladesh to the United States
Ambassadors of Bangladesh to France
Ambassadors of Bangladesh to Spain